A jato is a type of rotary hand-quern or grinder used in the Himalayan region of Nepal, Sikkim, Darjeeling and Bhutan. It is a traditional tool to grind grains.  

A jato consists of two round stones or discs.  The lower stone is immovable, attached to the ground or floor in the house, and it has a spike or a piece of wood (mānī) fixed in the centre as an axle to keep the upper stone in place while grinding. The upper stone has two holes in it, one going completely through the middle, both for the mānī and also to pour grain into.  The other hole goes partway in and is off-center to hold the wooden handle (hāto) used to turn the stone. The person who grinds sits next to the jato and grinds moving the handle in a circular motion, pouring grain into the central hole on top.

Advantages of the jato:

 Easy to use.
 Efficient flow of ground grains.
 Reduces the force needed to grind.

Disadvantages of the jato:

 Continuous use of the jato causes pain in the palm.
 Not suitable for children.
 It is immovable and bulky.

References

Kumar's Photo Blog : Jato (Grinder Stone), Jaato a traditional grinder machine used in Nepal https://kumar.anutreks.com/jaato/ 

Nepalese culture
Food grinding tools